Lindsay Davenport and Mary Joe Fernández were the defending champions, but lost in the final to Kim Clijsters and Martina Navratilova, 6–4, 2–6, [4–10].

Draw

Finals

External links 
 Women's Champions Doubles Draw

Women's Champions Invatiational